Stjørdalen is a former municipality in the old Nordre Trondhjem county in Norway. The  municipality existed from 1838 until its dissolution in 1850. The municipality covered the whole Stjørdalen valley in what is now the municipalities of Stjørdal and Meråker in Trøndelag county. The administrative centre was located at Værnes where Værnes Church is located.

History
The municipality of Stjørdalen was established on 1 January 1838 (see formannskapsdistrikt). In 1850, the municipality of Stjørdalen was divided into Øvre Stjørdal (population: 5,100) and Nedre Stjørdal (population: 6,543).

Name
The municipality (originally the parish) is named after the Stjørdalen valley. The first element is the genitive case of the local river name  (now called the Stjørdalselva river). The meaning of the river name is unknown.

Government
During its existence, this municipality was governed by a municipal council of elected representatives, which in turn elected a mayor.

Mayors
The mayors of Stjørdalen:

 1838–1841: Tobias Brodtkorb Bernhoft 
 1842–1843: Halvor Bachke  
 1844–1845: Ole Øvre Richter  
 1846–1849: Sivert Andreas Fergstad

See also
List of former municipalities of Norway

References

Stjørdal
Meråker
Former municipalities of Norway
1838 establishments in Norway
1850 disestablishments in Norway